Grove Farm may refer to:

in England
 Grove Farm, Somerset
 Grove Farm, Ealing, a Local Nature Reserve in London

in the United States
Grove Farm (Lihue, Hawaii), listed on the National Register of Historic Places (NRHP) 
Grove Farm Company Locomotives, Puhi, Hawaii, NRHP-listed
 Mount Airy (Sharpsburg, Maryland), also known as, and listed on the NRHP as, Grove Farm
 The Grove School in California, with a campus known as Grove Farm